Ernest Lorenzo Velasquez Dee (born November 5, 1988), professionally known as Enchong Dee, is a Filipino actor, model, and swimmer. Dee is a contract artist of ABS-CBN's Star Magic. He came to prominence after starring in his first major TV drama Katorse (2009). He played the role of "Luis" in the Filipino remake Maria la del Barrio (2011). He also starred in Ina, Kapatid, Anak (2012–13), and Muling Buksan ang Puso.
He is the younger brother of actor and model, AJ Dee.

Early life and education
Enchong Dee was born at 8:21 pm on November 5, 1988 at Mother Seton Hospital in Naga, Camarines Sur, to Johnson Molina Dee and Maria Theresa Diño Velasquez. He has two brothers, Angel James Dee, who is also an actor, while his younger brother, Isiah Dee, is a student in De La Salle–College of Saint Benilde. Enchong also has a young sister, Angelika Dee, who is a student in Immaculate Conception Cathedral School in Cubao, Quezon City.

He graduated from Naga Hope Christian School. He further pursued his swimming career at De La Salle University in Manila. Dee was part of the Philippine national swimming team and has participated in the SEA Games and 2006 Asian Games.

Career
Dee's first TV appearance in television came in 2006 when he appeared in a Philippine talk show Homeboy as one of the guests. He caught the eye of a modeling agency and advertisers and soon appeared in several advertising campaigns including Close Up, Bench, KFC and Timex.

In May 2007, Dee's contract with KFC expired and a few years later he transferred to Jollibee.

Dee landed several acting roles beginning in 2007 which have included Abt Ur Luv, Sineserye, Komiks, Your Song and My Girl.

In 2009, he was added to the main cast of Katorse, an adaptation of the 1968 film (that was also remade in 1981).

In 2010, he then reunited with some of his co-stars, Erich Gonzales and Ejay Falcon, in Tanging Yaman. He then became part of Magkaribal. He starred in the film, Sa 'yo Lamang where he gained award nominations and won the Gawad PASADO for Best Supporting Actor. Enchong gained his first movie lead role, alongside his premiere leading lady, Erich Gonzales, in I Do.

In 2011, he starred in the Philippines' remake of Maria La Del Barrio as Luis de la Vega.

He recently appeared in the 2012 film, The Reunion, with Enrique Gil, Xian Lim and Kean Cipriano. After co-starring in 2012–2013 teleserye Ina, Kapatid, Anak alongside Kim Chiu and Maja Salvador, he appeared in Muling Buksan Ang Puso with Julia Montes and Enrique Gil.

Enchong won the one-million pesos briefcase in the August 18, 2012 episode of "Kapamilya Deal Or No Deal" together with his "The Reunion" co-star Kean Cipriano.

In 2014, Dee release his first carrier single, Chinito Problems, as response to Yeng Constantino's 2013 hit Chinito.

Filmography

Television

Movies

Music video appearances

Discography

Albums

Awards and nominations

References

External links
Athlete page at the Asian Games

1988 births
Living people
De La Salle University alumni
Filipino male film actors
Filipino male models
Filipino male pop singers
Filipino male swimmers
Filipino male television actors
Filipino YouTubers
21st-century Filipino male actors
21st-century Filipino male singers
Bicolano actors
Bicolano people
Star Music artists
University Athletic Association of the Philippines players
Swimmers at the 2006 Asian Games
Competitors at the 2007 Southeast Asian Games
Sportspeople from Naga, Camarines Sur
Male actors from Camarines Sur
ABS-CBN personalities
Filipino television variety show hosts
The Philippine Star people
Asian Games competitors for the Philippines
Filipino people of Chinese descent
Southeast Asian Games competitors for the Philippines